Amit Kumar (born 20 June 1996) is an Indian cricketer. He made his first-class debut for Arunachal Pradesh in the 2018–19 Ranji Trophy on 7 January 2019.

References

External links
 

1996 births
Living people
Indian cricketers
Arunachal Pradesh cricketers
Place of birth missing (living people)